George Patrick Genereux (March 1, 1935 – April 10, 1989) was a Canadian gold medal-winning trap shooter and physician.

Genereux was born in Saskatoon, Saskatchewan, the son of Catherine Mary (née Devine), a nurse who was originally from Mount Carmel, Pennsylvania, and Dr. Arthur George Genereux. He is the maternal uncle of actor Brendan Fraser. While still a student at Nutana Collegiate, he won the gold medal in the Olympic Trap at the 1952 Summer Olympics in Helsinki, Finland.  He was, at the time, Canada's youngest Olympic champion, a record that stood until 2016.

In 1952, he was awarded the Lou Marsh Trophy. He was inducted into Canada's Sports Hall of Fame, the Saskatchewan Sports Hall of Fame, the Saskatoon Sports Hall of Fame, and, the Trapshooting Hall of Fame.

He received his Bachelor of Arts degree from the University of Saskatchewan and studied medicine at McGill University. He died in Saskatoon on April 10, 1989.

References

External links
CBC Archives: Sharpshooter George Genereux grabs gold
George Patrick Genereux at The Canadian Encyclopedia

1935 births
1989 deaths
Lou Marsh Trophy winners
McGill University Faculty of Medicine alumni
Olympic gold medalists for Canada
Olympic medalists in shooting
Olympic shooters of Canada
Shooters at the 1952 Summer Olympics
Sportspeople from Saskatoon
Trap and double trap shooters
University of Saskatchewan alumni
Medalists at the 1952 Summer Olympics
Canadian male sport shooters
Canadian people of American descent
20th-century Canadian people